Sons and Lovers is a 1960 British drama film directed by Jack Cardiff adapted from the semi-autobiographic novel of the same name by D. H. Lawrence. It stars Trevor Howard, Dean Stockwell, Wendy Hiller, Mary Ure and Heather Sears. Location shooting took place near Nottingham in the East Midlands of England, very close to where Lawrence himself grew up.

The film was nominated for seven Academy Awards, winning one for Best Cinematography. The film was also entered into the 1960 Cannes Film Festival.

Plot
A young man with artistic talent who lives in a close-knit, English coal-mining town during the early 20th century finds himself inhibited by his emotionally manipulative, domineering mother—a literary, psychological interpretation of the Oedipus story.

Gertrude Morel, miserable in her marriage, puts her hope into her son, Paul, who has the talent and ambition to become an artist, a desire that is mocked by his father, Walter, a miner who drinks heavily and sometimes shows his bitterness in violent ways.  Paul finds his own desires to escape to a different life sidetracked by his mother's possessiveness but also by local girl Miriam Leivers, with whom he has an intellectual relationship that he desires to become physical.  Miriam, though, suffers from her own mother's religious influence, viewing sex as sinful and dirty.

Paul's youngest brother, Arthur, dies in a mining accident, while older brother William flees to London.  When William later returns for a visit, he is accompanied by his new wife, a pretty and more affluent young lady who lacks literate romanticism or Gertrude's passionate sense.  When a sketch of  Paul's is exhibited in Nottingham, a wealthy art patron criticizes the work but later comes to the Morel house to offer support because he recognized Paul's potential as an artist.  Paul's desires are frustrated again, though, when Miriam rejects his physical advances and a violent confrontation between his parents convinces him that he is needed for his mother's financial support.

Paul takes a job in a factory, where he becomes enchanted with self-actualized and "liberated" feminist co-worker, Mrs. Clara Dawes, who is married, though separated. Nonetheless, he continues seeing Miriam, who finally agrees to have sex with him, which he comes to regret for making her do something that she so disliked.  Paul and Clara, though, eventually begin a passionate affair, but it is now Paul who does not feel that he can totally commit himself to her, in large part due to his mother's emotional hold on him.  Clara's husband threatens and later beats Paul, who returns home to his mother.  She has slipped into a morose depression due to Paul's growing distance from her, and she later becomes seriously ill, something that has been hinted at in her behavior for some time. Clara rejects Paul for his lack of emotional connection to her, but she confirms her own continuing feelings for her husband when he suffers an accident and she returns to him.

Paul and his father come to a kind of reconciliation as Gertrude lies dying.  After her death Walter tells his grieving son that he must find his own path in life.  Meeting Miriam one last time, he tells her that he is leaving.  She suggests that they marry so that she can support him, but Paul rejects her proposal of marriage, telling her that he intends to live the rest of his life without any serious relationship with another woman.

Cast
 Trevor Howard as Walter Morel
 Dean Stockwell as Paul Morel
 Wendy Hiller as Mrs. Morel
 Mary Ure as Clara Dawes
 Heather Sears as Miriam 
 William Lucas as William Morel
 Conrad Phillips as Baxter Dawes
 Ernest Thesiger as Mr. Hadlock
 Donald Pleasence as Pappleworth
 Rosalie Crutchley as Mrs. Leivers
 Sean Barrett as Arthur Morel
 Elizabeth Begley as Mrs. Radford
 Edna Morris as Mrs. Anthony
 Ruth Kettlewell as Mrs. Bonner
 Anne Sheppard as Rose
 Susan Travers as Betty
 Rosalie Ashley as Louisa
 Dorothy Gordon as Fanny
 Vilma Ann Leslie as Connie
 Anne Scott as Beatrice
 Patsy Smart as Emma
 Gwendolyn Watts as May
 Philip Ray as Dr. Ansell
 Trevor Little as Comedian
 Sheila Bernette as Polly

Production
Sons and Lovers was filmed on location in Nottingham, England, and at the Pinewood Studios, Iver Heath, Buckinghamshire, England. The musical theme by Mario Nascimbene was arranged for both piano and orchestra.

Dean Stockwell, whose performance was the most heavily criticised in reviews, was given the role of Paul at the insistence of producer Jerry Wald, who hoped that an American in the cast would increase the film's box-office appeal in the United States.

The part of Clara Dawes was offered to Joan Collins, but she turned it down. Her then-fiance Warren Beatty did not want her to do it and thought the script was "crap". The part went finally to Mary Ure, who was nominated for Academy Award for Best Supporting Actress.

Reception

Box office
By January 1961, the film had earned $1,500,000 in box office rentals from the United States and Canada and $800,000 in the United Kingdom. Kine Weekly called it a "money maker" at the British box office in 1960.

Critical reaction
Bosley Crowther of The New York Times wrote: "Sons and Lovers is sensitively felt and photographed in Jerry Wald's British-made film version of [Lawrence's novel] ... An excellent cast of British actors (and one American) play it well. And Jack Cardiff, camera man turned director, has filled it with picture poetry." Variety described the film as "a well-made and conscientious adaptation of the D. H. Lawrence's famed novel, smoothly directed by Jack Cardiff and superbly acted by a notable cast." The review particularly singled Trevor Howard for "giving a moving and wholly believable study of a man equally capable of tenderness as he is of being tough." Harrison's Reports wrote: "Prizeworthy performances are rendered by all, especially Trevor Howard as a humorous, drunken miner; Wendy Hiller as his wife; Dean Stockwell as the sensitive son; Heather Sears and Mary Ure as friends of Stockwell. Direction is outstanding; photography [is] fine."

Accolades

References

External links

FilmFour
Sons and Lovers at Turner Classic Movies
 

1960 films
1960s historical drama films
British black-and-white films
British historical drama films
Films based on British novels
Films based on works by D. H. Lawrence
Films directed by Jack Cardiff
Films produced by Jerry Wald
Films scored by Mario Nascimbene
Films whose cinematographer won the Best Cinematography Academy Award
Films whose director won the Best Director Golden Globe
Films shot at Pinewood Studios
20th Century Fox films
CinemaScope films
1960s English-language films
1960s British films